Planells is a surname. Notable people with the surname include:

Angel Planells (1901–1989), Spanish painter
Bartomeu Planells (1949–2021), Spanish businessman and politician
Hernando Planells (born 1976), American basketball coach

See also
Planell, another surname

Catalan-language surnames